Ærøya is an unpopulated island in Arendal municipality in Agder county, Norway. The islands of Havsøya and Merdø lie to the northeast, the islands of Store Torungen and Lille Torungen lie to the southeast, and the island of Gjervoldsøy lies to the west.

References

Arendal
Islands of Agder